Wadeichthys oxyops is an extinct archaeomaenid bony fish from the Koonwarra Lake fauna of Lower Cretaceous Victoria, Australia.  If the related genus Koonwarria is regarded as being in a different family, then W. oxyops is the only known Cretaceous-aged archaeomaenid.

History/Palaeontology 
The fossils of the Wadeichthys species were excavated during extensive work on the Koonwarra fossil bed in Victoria. It is located approximately 145 kilometres southeast of Melbourne near Leongatha in South Gippsland and has been dated 115-118 million years old through fossils of fish, worms, bird feathers, fleas, spiders and crabs.[1] The site was discovered in 1962 and was immediately recognised as an important site, known for "the wide diversity, abundance and quality of preservation of its fossil content."[2] This excavation was completed by a team of students from Monash University led by Palaeontologists Michael Waldman and Jim Warren. Warren went on to present his findings on the environmental setting of the Koonwarra fossil bed to the public in 1970 in an ABC documentary entitled Digging up Ancestors.[3] Warren showcased the Wadeichthys species and presented his hypothesis of the paleo-environment resulting in the mass fish "winterkills". [4]

Access to the site was initially limited through its proximity to a highway, abrupt annihilation at an adjacent railway cutting and 8 metre thickness. In 1966, bulldozers were used to strip the overburden at Koonwarra of an area of 600m2and palaeontologists at the site removed 14-16m3 of rock from the fossil bearing layer.[5] However, problems began to arise when it came to reducing the rock without harming fossils. To combat this, rocks were weathered at the Zoology/Comparative Physiology building at Monash University through spreading them out over flat roofs before splitting them.[6] This allowed for large numbers of well-preserved fossils to be found with little damage.  The fish bed is divided into two parts and occurs within a thickness of 7.1 metres of mudstone made up of graded laminae, which are composed layers of alternating claystone and siltstone.[7] This was interpreted by Waldman and Warren as a result of seasonal anoxia related to ice formation and thawing.[8] An accumulation of varved sediment was the result, in which Wadeichthys fossils were well preserved. The lower part of the fish bed is laminated and 0.23 metres thick, containing much larger fish fossils than the upper.[9] Between these two parts, there is a stratum of siltstone that may be split into thin sheets 6-12mm thick. The upper part was 1.24 metres thick and contained a large number of incomplete fish and plant fossils.[10] Above the upper fish bed there was a mudstone succession that was weathered to a stiff clay. 

The Wadeichthys species was the second smallest of the five extinct fish found at Koonwarra. [11] These five families of extinct fish known from the Koonwarra fossil bed include Ceratodontidae (Dipnoi), Leptolepididae (Clupeiformes), Archaeomaenidae (Pholidophoriformes), Coccolepididae (Palaeonisciformes) and Koonnwarriidae.[12] Palaeontologist Stephen Poropat identifies this site as "one of the great fossil localities of the Mesozoic era", earning it the name of Koonwarra Lagerstätte. [13]  The term Lagerstätte translates to 'storeroom place' and was coined by German palaeontologist Dolf Seilacher in 1970 to describe a site of where fossil are both abundant and exceptionally preserved. [14]
[1] Peter A. Jell and Peter M. Duncan, "Invertebrates, mainly insects, from the freshwater, lower Cretaceous, Koonwarra fossil bed (Korumburra Group), south Gippsland, Victoria," Memoirs of the Association of Australasian Palaeontologists 3, no. 1 (1986): 111.

[2] Poropat, "The Koonwarra Fossil Bed," 74.

[3] Poropat, "The Koonwarra Fossil Bed," 77.

[4] Poropat, "The Koonwarra Fossil Bed," 77.

[5] Jell and Peter M. Duncan, "Invertebrates", 111. 

[6] Poropat, "The Koonwarra Fossil Bed," 70.

[7] Lynne Bean, "Reappraisal of Mesozoic fishes and associated invertebrates and flora from Talbragar and Koonwarra, eastern Australia," Proceedings of the Royal Society of Victoria 129 (2007): 11, ResearchGate.

[8] Bean, "Reappraisal of Mesozoic fishes" 11.

[9] Michael Waldman, "Fish from the freshwater Lower Cretaceous, near Koonwarra, Victoria, Australia : with comments on the palaeo-environment," Special Papers in Palaeontology (The Palaeontological Association London, 1971), 95. 

[10] Waldman, "Fish," 95.

[11] Poropat, "The Koonwarra Fossil Bed," 75.

[12] Waldman, "Fish," 93.

[13] Jonathon Kendall, "Fight to protect Koonwarra fossil bed from works on South Gippsland Highway," ABC News, September 25, 2020, https://www.abc.net.au/news/2020-09-25/fight to-protect-koonwarra-fossil-bed-from-roadworks/12701594.

[14] Poropat, "The Koonwarra Fossil Bed," 70.
[1] Dale Russell, "The Mass Extinctions of the Late Mesozoic," Scientific American 246, no. 1 (1982): 58, JSTOR. 

[2] Russell, "The Mass Extinctions of the Late Mesozoic," 58.

[3] Stephen Poropat, "The Koonwarra Fossil Bed," Australian Age of Dinosaurs, February 18, 2018, 70.

[4] Jonathon Kendall, "Fight to protect Koonwarra fossil bed from works on South Gippsland Highway," ABC News, September 25, 2020, https://www.abc.net.au/news/2020-09-25/fight to-protect-koonwarra-fossil-bed-from-roadworks/12701594.

[5] Poropat, "The Koonwarra Fossil Bed," 75.

[6] Michael Waldman, "Fish from the freshwater Lower Cretaceous, near Koonwarra, Victoria, Australia : with comments on the palaeo-environment," Special Papers in Palaeontology (The Palaeontological Association London, 1971), 61.

[7] Poropat, "The Koonwarra Fossil Bed," 75.

External links
 Bony fish in the online Sepkoski Database
 

Prehistoric teleostei
Prehistoric ray-finned fish genera
Cretaceous bony fish
Prehistoric fish of Australia